Rogers Dry Lake is an endorheic desert salt pan in the Mojave Desert of Kern County, California. The lake derives its name from the Anglicization from the Spanish name, Rodriguez Dry Lake. It is the central part of Edwards Air Force Base as its hard surface provides a natural extension to the paved runways. It was formerly known as Muroc Dry Lake.

Geology
Rogers Dry Lake is located in the Antelope Valley, about  drive north of Los Angeles. It is the bed of a lake that formed roughly 2.5 million years ago, in the Pleistocene. The bed of the lake is unusually hard, capable of withstanding as much as 250 psi without cracking. This is sufficient to allow even the heaviest aircraft to land safely.

During the extremely brief rainy season, standing water may be on the lakebed, pooling near the location of the region's lowest elevation (2,300 ft). The lake is adjacent to the smaller Rosamond Lake which through the Holocene, together made up one large water-body.

History
The area of the lakebed was first used by the railroads, with a watering station for steam engines located nearby by the Atchison, Topeka and Santa Fe Railroad.  In 1910, the Corum family settled on the lake bed; they attempted to create a small community called "Muroc" (the name reversed), which failed.  In 1933, the United States Army arrived, looking to establish a bombing range in the area.  The lakebed's potential use as an airfield was then realized, and in 1937 the United States Army Air Corps set up Muroc Air Field for training and testing; the airfield later became Edwards Air Force Base.

During World War II, a  replica of a Japanese cruiser was constructed on the lakebed, nicknamed "Muroc Maru". The ship was demolished in 1950.

Edwards Air Force Base
Many of the United States' notable aeronautical achievements have taken place at Rogers Lake, including the testing of experimental military aircraft, the breaking of the sound barrier by Chuck Yeager, and landings of the Space Shuttle.  It is also famous for the world's largest compass rose painted into the lakebed.  It was designated a National Historic Landmark in 1985.

Its principal runway is 04/22.  In addition to its paved component of  it has an extra  of lakebed runway, and it is capable of landing all known aircraft.

There are seven other official runways on the Rogers lakebed:
 17/35 is 7.5 mi (12.1 km) (primary runway)
 05/23 is 5.2 mi (8.4 km)
 06/24 is 1.4 mi (2.3 km)
 07/25 is 4.0 mi (6.4 km)
 09/27 is 2.0 mi (3.2 km)
 30 is 2.0 mi (3.2 km) (runway 30 rolls out onto the compass rose, so its corresponding, unmarked, runway 12 is never used)
 15/33 is 6.2 mi (10.0 km)
 18/36 is 4.5 mi (7.2 km)

See also
 List of lakes in California
 List of National Historic Landmarks in California

References

External links

 Official Edwards Air Force Base website

Endorheic lakes of California
Edwards Air Force Base
Lakes of the Mojave Desert
Lakes of Kern County, California
Landforms of Kern County, California
Salt flats of California
Military facilities on the National Register of Historic Places in California
National Historic Landmarks in California
National Register of Historic Places in Kern County, California
Protected areas of the Mojave Desert
Lakes of Southern California
Lakes of California